Edward Brake Jackson (January 25, 1793 – September 8, 1826) was a U.S. Representative from Virginia, son of George Jackson and brother of John G. Jackson.

Biography
Born in Clarksburg, Virginia (now West Virginia), Jackson attended Randolph Academy at Clarksburg.
He studied medicine and commenced practice in Clarksburg.
During the War of 1812 he was assigned as a surgeon's mate, Third Regular Virginia Militia, at Fort Meigs, Ohio.
He served as a member of the State house of delegates 1815–1818.
He served as clerk of the United States district court in 1819.

Jackson was elected as a Democratic-Republican to the Sixteenth Congress to fill the vacancy caused by the resignation of James Pindall and reelected to the Seventeenth Congress and served from October 23, 1820, to March 3, 1823.
He declined to be a candidate for renomination in 1822.
He died at Bedford Springs, near Bedford, Pennsylvania, September 8, 1826.
He was interred near Bedford, Pennsylvania.

Electoral history
1821; Jackson won election with 75.22% of the vote, defeating Federalist Thomas Wilson.

Sources

1793 births
1826 deaths
Military personnel from Clarksburg, West Virginia
American military personnel of the War of 1812
Jackson family of West Virginia
Members of the Virginia House of Delegates
Politicians from Clarksburg, West Virginia
People from West Virginia in the War of 1812
Democratic-Republican Party members of the United States House of Representatives from Virginia